Giuseppe D'Agata (11 January 1927 – 29 March 2011) was an Italian author, screenwriter and television writer.

Life and career 
Born in Bologna, the son of a typographer, at 17 years old D'Agata became a militant in the partisan brigade "Matteotti Sap" and then in 1944 he enrolled the Socialist Party and later the Italian Socialist Party of Proletarian Unity. He wrote several novels based on his own experiences as a partisan, and some of his novels such as L' esercito di Scipione and Il medico della mutua were adapted into films. He was also active as a screenwriter and a television writer, often collaborating with Andrea Camilleri. His last work was the novel Pippo per gli amici, released in 2007.

References

External links 
 
 

1927 births
2011 deaths
Writers from Bologna
20th-century Italian male writers
21st-century Italian male writers
20th-century Italian novelists
21st-century Italian novelists
Italian screenwriters
Italian television writers
Italian male screenwriters
Male television writers